Trevor Whymark (born 4 May 1950) is a former England international footballer who played in the Football League in the 1970s and 1980s, notably with Ipswich Town. He is currently (2016) the team's sixth highest goal scorer.

Ipswich Town
Whymark started his football career with Anglian Combination team Diss Town whilst working his office job at a Diss builders' merchant and was signed by Bobby Robson in 1969.

Whymark made his Ipswich League debut in February 1970 against Manchester City. In the remaining part of the season Whymark made six full and two substitute appearances, scoring his first and only goal in a vital 2–0 victory over fellow relegation strugglers Sunderland.
The following season Whymark only recorded eight full appearances with two substitute appearances and a single goal (in a 4–0 victory of Manchester United). It would appear this was a season cut short by injury as all of these games were played before October 10. It is also worth noting that following an injury to goalkeeper David Best in a game against West Bromwich Albion Whymark came off the bench to play in goal.

During the 1971/72 season Whymark was, bar an early substitute appearance, absent from the first team until February 1972. After that he had a run of 13 games, one as substitute where he netted four goals. Whymark had struck up a useful relationship with Leeds signing Rod Belfitt who had joined the club in November.

At the beginning of the 1972/1973 season Robson gave Whymark a chance to establish himself as Rod Belfitt's striking partner and the partnership scored 10 goals with Whymark contributing three. Surprisingly, given that Belfitt was Ipswich's top scorer, he was exchanged for young Everton striker David Johnson but this change suited Whymark who netted another eight league goals that season ending up as joint top scorer with attacking midfielder Bryan Hamilton on 11 goals. Whymark also scored five goals in Ipswich's successful Texaco Cup campaign including one in the second-leg of the final against local rivals Norwich City.

Finishing fourth in Division 1 in the previous season meant that Ipswich could compete in the UEFA Cup. After a 1-0 aggregate first round victory against Real Madrid, the undoubted highlight of the campaign was the first leg 4–0 victory over Italian team Lazio where Whymark scored all four goals.

Before the return match he was presented with a trophy from some AS Roma supporters and this infuriated the volatile Lazio fans ensuring the second-leg in Italy was played in a hostile atmosphere. In a 2007 interview Whymark stated he had left the pitch carrying an iron bar for protection.

Whymark scored one further UEFA Cup goal against Twente Enscehde.

Meanwhile, in the league Whymark had another good season with 11 goals in 39 games plus a further goal in the League Cup.

Whymark was joint top league scorer (with Bryan Hamilton) in the 1974/75 season with 10 goals from 40 games supplemented by an FA Cup and three League Cup goals.

The following 1975/76 season Whymark was the 13 league and two UEFA cup goals. For the second season in succession Whymark represented Ipswich in 40 (out of 42) league games.

During the close season Whymark's striking partner David Johnson was transferred to Liverpool. In his place Paul Mariner was signed from Plymouth Argyle but on his debut against West Bromwich Albion it was Whymark who scored four goals in a 7–0 victory (Mariner also scored). Whymark scored 14 league goals in 36 appearances during the 1976/77 season including a hat trick against Norwich City resulting in him being the top scorer again. In other competitions Whymark managed a goal in the FA Cup.

A serious knee injury limited Whymark to 19 league appearances with nine goals in 1977. This still meant he was Ipswich's second highest scorer behind Mariner and was supplemented by five League Cup goals in three games. In the UEFA Cup Whymark managed six appearances and six goals including his third instance of four goals in a game against Landskrona BoIS.
Ipswich won the FA Cup in 1978 but Whymark missed the game due to his knee injury and also didn't play in any of the rounds en route to the final.
The following 1978/79 season saw an injury ridden Whymark limited to eight league appearances with a single goal (against Liverpool). He did play in three FA Cup, one League Cup and three European Cup Winners Cup games.
This proved to be the last season Whymark played for Ipswich Town and there can be no doubt that he was a fine servant for the club. In a 2007 interview Whymark spoke of his relationship with Bobby Robson:
"We didn't have the best of relationships on a personal level but I think he respected me for what I could do and how I did it. And I respected him for what he's achieved and how's it done, so there was a mutual respect in football terms. I never sat down and had a conversation with him about anything other than football."
Following his realise from Ipswich; Whymark joined Derby County where he was limited to just two appearances before contracting Glandular Fever which affected his fitness. He left Derby to play in Canada with Vancouver Whitecaps.

Vancouver Whitecaps
In 1979 Whymark moved to play for Vancouver Whitecaps of the North American Soccer League, and during his two seasons in Canada he scored 25 goals for the Whitecaps in 57 games. Trevor scored both goals, including the game winner in the 60th minute of Vancouver's 2-1 Soccer Bowl victory over the Tampa Bay Rowdies in 1979.

Return to the UK
After that he had Football League spells with Grimsby Town, Southend United, Peterborough United and Colchester United.

England career
Whymark was first picked for the England under 23 team to play in a match against Holland which took place on 2 January 1973 with Whymark scoring a goal in a 3–1 victory played at Highbury. He featured in six under-23 games up to June that season, scoring against Scotland in a 2–1 away victory at Kilmarnock and against Denmark in a 1–1 draw.
After that he feature in one more game on 19 January 1974 where England beat Portugal 3–2 in the Benfica stadium although Whymark did not score.

Whymark played a single game for England national football team against Luxembourg in 1977.

Post playing career
After retiring from the professional game, Whymark spent a year as player-manager with Diss Town.
In 1999/2000 he became coach of Norwich City's under-13 side, and he then returned to Ipswich Town to perform a similar role with their under-12 side.

Honours

Ipswich Town
Texaco Cup Winner: 1973
Charity Shield Runner up: 1978
FA Cup Winner: 1978 (did not play - injured)

Vancouver Whitecaps
NASL Winner 1979

Individual
Ipswich Town Hall of Fame: Inducted 2012

References

External links
prideofanglia.com - Player Profile and photo at Pride of Anglia

1950 births
Living people
Ipswich Town F.C. players
Sparta Rotterdam players
Derby County F.C. players
Vancouver Whitecaps (1974–1984) players
Grimsby Town F.C. players
Southend United F.C. players
Peterborough United F.C. players
Colchester United F.C. players
Diss Town F.C. players
English footballers
English expatriate footballers
Association football forwards
England international footballers
England under-23 international footballers
English Football League players
North American Soccer League (1968–1984) players
Eredivisie players
Expatriate soccer players in Canada
English expatriate sportspeople in Canada
Expatriate footballers in the Netherlands
English expatriate sportspeople in the Netherlands
Norwich City F.C. non-playing staff
Ipswich Town F.C. non-playing staff
Grimsby Town F.C. non-playing staff
People from South Norfolk (district)